Black Spiders are an English rock band based in Sheffield, England.  Their latest and third studio album entered the UK Rock Chart reaching No. 9. re-entering again at No. 28, after Record Store Day (drop ii)

History
The band formed in early 2008, originally playing a few shows under the name 'the Black Spiders'. They released the three track single "St. Peter" in December 2008, to coincide with a small run of dates with Airbourne on mainland Europe in December of the same year, their first ever tour.

A four track EP Cinco Hombres, Diez Cojones followed in June 2009, shortly after the band's first appearance at the Download festival at Castle Donington which was to be the first release on the band’s own record label Dark Riders.

The band’s second EP No Goats in the Omen was released in May 2010, to coincide with the band's first headline tour of the UK.

Black Spiders gained early positive reviews in the rock press, with Kerrang! and Classic Rock featuring them on their 'Introducing' and 'High Hopes' sections. Both Rock Sound and Classic Rock  also listed them among their 'ones to watch'.

After favourable reviews of early shows in the press the band picked up support slots for numerous other acts.  They played UK dates supporting Airbourne and Black Stone Cherry, The Datsuns, Stone Gods and Danko Jones to name a few. In September 2009 they supported The Wildhearts on their UK tour and The Answer in November. A further tour with Airbourne of the UK and Ireland followed before the band embarked on their own headline tour which consisted of sixteen dates across the UK. In 2009, the band played Download Festival and the Hard Rock Hell III festivals.

In 2010, the band played at the iTunes Festival with Ozzy Osbourne, after winning a competition held by MySpace and iTunes, to find an unsigned band in the UK, which had over 500 other entries. The band also played festivals in Essen Devilside, headlined SOS in Manchester, Zwarte Cross in the Netherlands and a show in Victoria Park at the High Voltage Festival, alongside Orange Goblin, ZZ Top, Heaven & Hell and Down. They played at Sonisphere 2010 at Knebworth on the Bohemia stage. They also played the Main Stage at Bloodstock Open Air in 2010. They were named the 'Best Underground Band' in the Metal Hammer Golden Gods Awards in 2010. At the end of 2010, the band embarked on a huge European tour with Airbourne and after some cancelled dates with Volbeat the band finished off the year playing the rest of the UK dates with Airbourne.

The band’s debut album Sons of the North was released on 7 February 2011 to positive reviews in the press, both in the UK and in mainland Europe. Towards the end of February 2011 they embarked on a sold out headline UK tour with Turbowolf and Viking Skull in support, with a further set of sold out dates to follow in May 2011 with support from Japanese Voyeurs. In between these tours Black Spiders were invited to play in China, at the Beijing Stadium in Chaoyung Park along with other UK acts. The band played six shows over three days, climaxing with their headline appearance on the final day on the main stage. After their return, they played at various festivals across Europe including the prestigious Rock Am Ring and Rock Im Park in Germany and Graspop Festival in Belgium and award shows for Kerrang! and Metal Hammer. The band then played to one of their largest audiences to date in the UK as headliners on the Jägermeister Stage on 9 July at the Sonisphere Festival at Knebworth Park. In the summer of 2011, the band were asked for a second year to play at the High Voltage Festival this time playing as main support on the Metal Hammer stage to Neurosis on 24 July. This was followed by three dates with Karma to Burn. At the end of 2011, Black Spiders played UK dates with Volbeat and then ended the year with their longest tour in mainland Europe with New Jersey Stoner/Space Rockers Monster Magnet.

2012 began with Black Spiders starting the writing and recording of new material for their second studio album. In April they joined Skindred and Therapy? on the Jagermeister Tour 2012, with a week long run of dates in the UK. They will then be supporting Irish rockers Thin Lizzy in May on their second leg of their 2012 UK tour and Guns N' Roses on selected dates of their Up Close and Personal Tour.

In 2012, Black Spiders covered "The God That Failed" by Metallica for Kerrang'''s Black Album Covered.

Black Spiders played at Bingley Music Live on Saturday 1 September 2012.

In May 2013, the band announced that their second album would be called This Savage Land which is planned for release in September 2013. The production of the new album was funded by fan pledges via an online music pledge service. An eight day UK tour was announced to follow at the beginning of October 2013

In 2016, the band announced their breakup with a "F*** Off Black Spiders" eight day farewell tour in the UK. Their last performance was at Sheffield Corporation on 16 June 2017 (rescheduled from 2 May 2017).

In September 2020, the band announced that they have reformed and would be recording new material and playing live again with new drummer Wyatt Wendels.

In March 2021, after writing a new album throughout lockdowns and recording when able to, the band released their new self title album 'Black Spiders' to very positive reviews.

Unable to follow this up with a tour, due to the Pandemic, the band were only able to play a warm up show and Bloodstock festival in August 2021, with an album tour planned for November 2021.

Musical style
Their music is fast paced and energetic, drawing upon bands such as Black Sabbath, Motörhead AC/DC, Turbonegro, Led Zeppelin, The Stooges and Aerosmith as influences.

Discography
Studio albumsSons of the North (2011) UK chart peak: No. 172
 This Savage Land (2013) UK chart peak: No. 59Black Spiders (2021) UK Independent Albums Chart: No. 7

SinglesSt. Peter (2008)Stay Down (2009)Just Like a Woman (2010)Kiss Tried to Kill Me (2012)Creatures (2012)Balls (2013)Teenage Knife Gang (2013)Stick it to the Man (2014)Fly in the Soup (2020)Good Times (2021)Give Em What They Want (2021)

EPsCinco Hombres, Diez Cojones (2009)No Goats in the Omen (2010)Rat Mansion (2014)Deaf Proof (2021)

CompilationsVolume'' (2011) - compilation of the first single and first two EPs

References

External links

English hard rock musical groups
Musical groups established in 2008
English stoner rock musical groups
Musical groups from Sheffield